Hasanabad-e Shahzadeh (also Romanized as Ḩasanābād-e Shāhzādeh; also known as Ḩasanābād) is a village in Mahmudabad-e Seyyed Rural District, in the Central District of Sirjan County, Kerman Province, Iran. At the 2006 census, its population was 108, in 26 families.

References 

Populated places in Sirjan County